The 1966 Tennessee gubernatorial election was held on November 8, 1966. Democratic nominee Buford Ellington won the election with 81.22% of the vote.

Primary elections
Primary elections were held on August 4, 1966.

Democratic primary

Candidates
Buford Ellington, former Governor
John Jay Hooker, attorney

Results

General election

Candidates
Major party candidate
Buford Ellington, Democratic

Other candidates
H.L. Crowder, Independent
Charlie Moffett, Independent
Charles Gordon Vick, Independent

Results

References

1966
Tennessee
Gubernatorial
November 1966 events in the United States